Nikola Mektić and Mate Pavić defeated Adrian Mannarino and Fabrice Martin in the final, 6–4, 6–2 to win the doubles tennis title at the 2022 Astana Open.

Santiago González and Andrés Molteni were the defending champions, but did not compete together. González partnered Łukasz Kubot, but lost in the first round to Tim Pütz and Michael Venus. Molteni partnered Francisco Cerúndolo, but lost in the first round to Kevin Krawietz and Andreas Mies.

Seeds

Draw

Draw

Qualifying

Seeds

Qualifiers
  Diego Hidalgo /  Cristian Rodríguez

Qualifying draw

References

External links
Main draw
Qualifying draw

Astana Open - Doubles